Macrobathra hedrastis is a moth in the family Cosmopterigidae. It is found in Burma.

References

Natural History Museum Lepidoptera generic names catalog

Macrobathra